Pittwater is a body of water extending south from Broken Bay.

Pittwater may also refer to:

 Electoral district of Pittwater, New South Wales state electorate
 Pittwater Council, local government area
 Pittwater Park
 Pittwater Road
 Pittwater (Tasmania)